North Star is a 1925 American silent drama film directed by Paul Powell and starring Virginia Lee Corbin, Stuart Holmes, and Ken Maynard. The film was made as a showcase for Strongheart the Dog, a rival of Rin Tin Tin. Future star Clark Gable appears in a supporting role.

Plot
As described in a film magazine review, the friends of Noel Blake, a wealthy young man, contrive a plot by which he is made to believe himself to be a murderer. He flees to the northwest timber country without his two best friends, his dog North Star, or Marcia Gale, the sister of one of his friends. He is followed by Dick Robbins, a man who intends to blackmail him and extort money from him. Marcia and the dog trail the villain close behind. At the end, after a fight between Noel and the blackmailer, the dog pursues the villain to his death over a cliff.

Cast

References

Bibliography
 Munden, Kenneth White. The American Film Institute Catalog of Motion Pictures Produced in the United States, Part 1. University of California Press, 1997.

External links

1925 films
1925 drama films
Silent American drama films
Films directed by Paul Powell
American silent feature films
1920s English-language films
American black-and-white films
Films set in Canada
Associated Exhibitors films
1920s American films